Leslie Hann (3 June 1911 – 1988) was an English professional footballer who played in the Football League for Accrington Stanley as an inside left.

References 

English Football League players
English footballers
1911 births
1988 deaths
Association football inside forwards
Association football wing halves
Footballers from Gateshead
West Ham United F.C. players
Ashington A.F.C. players
Blyth Spartans A.F.C. players
Accrington Stanley F.C. (1891) players
Leyton Orient F.C. players
Walsall F.C. wartime guest players